"Wind Chimes" is a song by the American rock band the Beach Boys from their 1967 album Smiley Smile and their unfinished Smile project. Written by Brian Wilson and Van Dyke Parks, it was inspired by wind chimes hanging outside Wilson's home and was one of the first pieces tracked for the Smile sessions.

The original version of "Wind Chimes" was recorded from August to October 1966 and featured a coda that consisted of multiple overdubbed pianos played in counterpoint from each other. In July 1967, the band rerecorded the song with a significantly different arrangement for inclusion on Smiley Smile. The original Smile recordings were later released on the compilations Good Vibrations: Thirty Years of the Beach Boys (1993) and The Smile Sessions (2011).

Background
Brian's wife Marilyn said: "We went shopping one day and we brought home some wind chimes. We hung them outside the house and then one day, while Brian was sitting around he sort of watched them out the window and then he wrote the song. I think that’s how it happened. Simple. He does a lot of things that way."

Smile sessions
"Wind Chimes", in its original form, was first tracked on August 3, 1966 at Gold Star Studios. The occasion marked the unofficial start of the Smile sessions. Another version of the track was recorded on October 3, which was later followed by further overdubs on October 5 and 10 at Western Studio. Writing in The Wire, Mike Barnes remarked of the Smile version of the song, "'Wind Chimes', with its exquisite tuned percussion, seems certain to have been influenced by Steve Reich's Drumming, but then you realise it was recorded five years before Reich's minimalist masterpiece was even composed."

In a March 1967 article for Teen Set, band associate Michael Vosse wrote of a half-hour recording session involving the overdubbing of contrapuntal "music box" piano parts,

Vosse referred to "Wind Chimes" explicitly in a 1969 article for Fusion, again recalling the "music box" tag section, and said, "at that time it [the song] was considered a tentatively finished product." He also wrote,

Smiley Smile sessions
The Smiley Smile version of "Wind Chimes" was recorded on July 10 and 11, 1967 at Wilson's makeshift home studio. This version differed significantly from its Smile counterpart. In the description of Record Collectors Jamie Atkins, "'Wind Chimes', previously breezy and bucolic, became tense and claustrophobic; the usually angelic harmonies of the Beach Boys sound discordant, even malevolent, until the end of the track when a beautiful a cappella flourish gives way to a barely audible Dennis, Brian and Carl harmony tag." The tag contains a melody that was previously used in Wilson's "Holidays".

Legacy
In July 1967, the bass line from the Smile version of "Wind Chimes" was reworked into another song, "Can't Wait Too Long".

On December 23, 1967, "Wind Chimes" was issued as the B-side of the band's "Wild Honey" single.

In 1994, "Wind Chimes" was sampled by German electronica duo Mouse on Mars in their song "Die Seele von Brian Wilson".

Personnel
Per band archivist Craig Slowinski, these credits pertain to the Smile version.

The Beach Boys
Brian Wilson – overdubbed grand and tack pianos 
Carl Wilson – lead vocal, Fender bass, 12-string electric guitar, finger snaps, wood blocks

Guest
Van Dyke Parks – marimbas

Session musicians

Chuck Berghofer – upright bass (verses) 
Hal Blaine – drums, sticks
Frank Capp – temple blocks
Sam Glenn Jr. – tenor saxophone
Bill Green – clarinet
Jim Horn – clarinet
Carol Kaye – Danelectro bass
Larry Knechtel – grand piano
Al de Lory – electric harpsichord
Jay Migliori – tenor saxophone
Don Randi – tack piano, celeste
Lyle Ritz – upright bass (chorus and tag)

Cover versions

 1990 – The Mooseheart Faith, Smiles, Vibes & Harmony: A Tribute to Brian Wilson
 1998 – David Grubbs, Smiling Pets
 2000 – Katrina Mitchell & Bill Wells, Caroline Now!

References

External links
 
 
 
 
 

1967 songs
The Beach Boys songs
Brian Wilson songs
Songs written by Brian Wilson
Songs written by Van Dyke Parks
Song recordings produced by Brian Wilson
Song recordings produced by the Beach Boys